Edmonton Christian High School is a Christian high school (grades 10–12) in Edmonton, Alberta, operated by the Edmonton Society for Christian Education, and established in 1965. ECHS provides Christ-centred education from students grade 10–12. Edmonton Christian High School is a sister school to Edmonton Christian Northeast School and Edmonton Christian West School.

History
The school was built in 1965 next to Edmonton Christian West School, and offered education up to Grade 11, which was extended to Grade 12 in 1969.

Programs Offered
Core Subjects include- Religious Studies, Math, Social Studies, English, Science, Biology, Chemistry, Physics and Physical Education (It is required for all students in grade 10 to take Physical Education during grade 10.)
Electives include- French, Music, Leadership, Drama, Art, Physical Education (grade 10. 11 and 12), and CTS courses.

Size
Edmonton Christian High School is populated by approximately 300 students.

References

External links
Edmonton Christian High School
Edmonton Society for Christian Education

High schools in Edmonton
Educational institutions established in 1965
Nondenominational Christian schools in Canada
1965 establishments in Alberta